101 Marietta Street, formerly Centennial Tower, is a , 36-story skyscraper in downtown Atlanta, Georgia. The property is considered a class "A" office building consisting of 600,000 square feet.

The U.S. Census Bureau has its Atlanta regional office in Centennial Tower.

See also
List of tallest buildings in Atlanta

References

External links
 Centennial Tower – Jackson Oats Shaw Corporate Real Estate

Skyscraper office buildings in Atlanta
Office buildings completed in 1975